The Nanticoke Lenni-Lenape people (also known as Nanticoke Lenape) are a tribal confederation of Nanticoke of the Delmarva Peninsula and the Lenape of southern New Jersey and northern Delaware. They are recognized by the state of New Jersey, having reorganized and maintained elected governments since the 1970s. They have not yet achieved federal recognition.

The tribe is made up of descendants of Algonquian-speaking Nanticoke and Lenape peoples who remained in, or returned to, their ancient homeland at the Delaware Bay.  Many of their relatives suffered removals and forced migrations to the central United States and Canada. The Nanticoke and Lenni-Lenape peoples were among the first in what is now the United States to resist European encroachment upon their lands, among the first to sign treaties in an attempt to create a peaceful co-existence, and were among the first to be forced onto reservations on the Delmarva Peninsula and in New Jersey. The tribe's current headquarters is in Bridgeton, New Jersey. The history of the tribe's ancestors in the region goes back thousands of years to successive indigenous cultures.

The Council of the Nanticoke Lenni-Lenape Tribe passed a law forbidding participation in casino gaming and the sale of cigarettes or alcohol, which many other tribes have relied on to generate revenues for their programs and welfare.

The Nanticoke Lenni-Lenape Tribe is not affiliated with the "Unalachtigo Band of the Nanticoke Lenni-Lenape Nation" of southern New Jersey and does not recognize them as an official tribe.

Lenape history in southern New Jersey and northern Delaware 
The Lenape ancestors of the modern tribe are those who inhabited present-day New Jersey, Delaware, southeastern New York and eastern Pennsylvania at the time of European encounter. They called themselves Lenni-Lenape, which means "Original People" or "Common People." From the early 17th century, the English settlers referred to the Lenape people as “Delaware Indians,” after their location along the Delaware River, which the English named after one of their own leading figures, Thomas West, 3rd Baron De La Warr. Archeologists have found evidence that succeeding cultures of indigenous peoples have lived in this area for as much as 12,000 years; they were likely the ancestors of the Lenape peoples.

The Lenape were divided among speakers of three major dialects, with language groups occupying particular territories. Each major group was made up of smaller independent but interrelated communities or bands; together they occupied territory from the northern part of the tribe's ancient homeland at the headwaters of the Delaware River, down to the Delaware Bay, and north into New Jersey, the area around New York City and western Long Island. The Munsee (People of the Stony Country) lived in the north. The Unami (People Down River) and Unalachtigo (People Who Live Near the Ocean) lived in the central and southern part of the homeland.

The Lenni-Lenape are historically part of the Algonquian language family, as are most of the indigenous peoples along the Atlantic coast. Many Algonquian tribes have referred to the Lenape as the “grandfathers” or “ancient ones.” They are considered to have developed as one of the earliest northeastern nations.  The European colonists often relied on the Lenape to settle disputes among neighboring tribal groups, and admired them for their hospitality and diplomatic skill.

In the eighteenth century, the British colonists set aside the Brotherton Reservation (1758–1802) in Burlington County, New Jersey for the Lenape, but colonists continued to encroach on their territory. In 1802 some Lenape migrated from this area to Utica, New York, where they joined the remnant Stockbridge-Munsee for a period. Together the peoples accepted relocation to Wisconsin in the early 19th century, where descendants still occupy a reservation.

Nanticoke history from the Delmarva into southern New Jersey 
Ancestors to the Nanticoke lived in the area for thousands of years. The Nanticoke ancestors of the modern Nanticoke Lenni-Lenape tribe lived along the Indian River in southeastern Delaware and the Eastern Shore of Maryland. Called the “Tidewater People,” the Nanticoke, like many of their neighboring tribes, have ancient origins in common with the Lenape, originating from among the Algonquian-language speaking peoples.

The Nanticoke resisted European colonial intrusion into their homeland as early as the 1650s. After years of struggle, Nanticoke people survive today in Delaware, New Jersey, and other parts of the United States and Canada.

Nanticoke migration began in the early 17th century from the Eastern Shore of Maryland through southeastern Delaware to evade European encroachment. By the 19th century many had settled along the shores of the Delaware River and into parts of southern New Jersey. As a result of this migration, Nanticoke people intermarried and united with the Lenni-Lenape who remained in New Jersey.

As early as 1704, the English colonial governments restricted the Nanticoke living in the Delmarva Peninsula to the Chicone (Chiconi), Broad Creek, and Indian River reservations.  As the reservations were not sufficient to end colonial encroachment, they were disbanded. The Indian communities remained in the areas of the former reservations, becoming "isolate" groups. Over time they intermarried with other ethnicities among their neighbors and absorbed them into their culture.

Isolated group remains after many migrate 
Because of continuing conflict with European settlers encroaching upon Tribal lands, many of the Tribe’s members were killed or removed from their homelands. Threatened and attacked, some had moved to Canada after the American Revolutionary War; because of the Iroquois nations' alliances with the British, American settlers turned against all Native Americans. Some Lenape migrated west to Ohio, from where they were later removed to Indian Territory in Kansas and Oklahoma.

Some were able to continue to live in the homeland. Those who remained survived through attempting to adapt to the dominant culture, becoming farmers and tradesmen. Many Nanticoke-Lenape Indians embraced Christianity while not forgetting or devaluing many ancient tribal ways.

Tribal church congregations have been a means for the Nanticoke Lenni-Lenape to preserve their culture, maintain ties with nearby related tribal communities, and continue a form of tribal governance. One of the historical tribal congregations, Saint John United Methodist Church of Fordville, New Jersey is the only Native American Church in New Jersey so designated by the United Methodist Church. By the 20th century, most of the Nanticoke Lenni-Lenape Tribe’s population resided in and around Cumberland and Salem counties in New Jersey. They were associated with the isolated Nanticoke and Lenape tribal communities in Sussex and Kent counties in Delaware.

Governance 
In 1978, The Nanticoke Lenni-Lenape Tribe established a tribally governed 501(c)3 non-profit community benefit agency, “The Nanticoke Lenni-Lenape Indians of New Jersey.” It is chartered for educational, social, and cultural purposes, to promote the welfare of Native Americans who reside in the Delaware Valley; to extend charity in all forms to those Native Americans in need, giving priority to Nanticoke Lenni-Lenape Indians residing in the Delaware Valley; to establish cultural and instructional facilities; to improve health and welfare, housing, human rights, and economic security; to acquire and preserve land and water areas in a natural scenic or open condition consistent with the heritage of the Native Americans who reside in the Delaware Valley.

In 1982, the tribe believed it received official recognition from the State of New Jersey, via Senate Concurrent Resolution Number 73. This was reaffirmed through tribe's statutory inclusion on the New Jersey State Commission on American Indian Affairs (New Jersey Public Law 1995 c. 295;  New Jersey Statutes 52:16A-53 et. seq.).

The largest American Indian tribe in New Jersey, the Nanticoke Lenni-Lenape enjoy friendly relations with the nation of Sweden, which acknowledges its tribal identity and sovereignty. Sweden recently celebrated its more than 350-year-old treaty of friendship with the Tribe, dating to the early settlement of the Swedes and Finns in the Land of the Lenape, before Dutch and British colonial powers settled in the area.

The Nanticoke Lenni-Lenape Tribe is governed by a nine-member elected Tribal Council. All council members must be enrolled citizens of the tribe. The tribe has determined that membership is dependent on tribal Indian blood quantum and documented descent from core families. The Nanticoke Lenni-Lenape Tribe has more than 3000 enrolled citizens in more than 1500 households.

Other Nanticoke-Lenape descendants and extended family, who are not members, also live in southern New Jersey and the surrounding area. They may participate in many tribal activities. According to the 2000 United States Census, an additional 9000 persons other than enrolled members identified as Native American who live in the Cumberland County, New Jersey area. This is a State Designated American Indian Statistical Area (SDAISA), part of the state and federal recognition of certain areas as having significant American Indian populations.

References

Sources
 Babcock, William H. The Nanticoke Indians of Indian River, Delaware. “American Anthropologists, New Series,” Vol. 1, No. 2., April 1899
 Fitzgerald, Neil. "Delaware's Forgotten Minority - The Moors", Delaware Today, January 1972 issue, 10
 Gilbert, Jr., William Harlen. Social Forces, Vol. 2, No. 4. University of North Carolina Press, May 1946
 Gilbert, William H. Surviving Indian Groups of the Eastern United States, Annual Report of the Smithsonian Institution, provided to the Library of Congress, 1948
 Heckwelder, John. History Manners and Customs of the Indian Nations Who Once Inhabited Pennsylvania and the Neighboring States. Philadelphia, PA: Historical Society of Pennsylvania, ed. 1876.
 Heite, Edward F. and Cara Lee Blume. "A Community on McKee Road," Delaware Department of Transportation Archaeology Series No. 109., Camden, Delaware: Heite Consulting, 1994
 Heite, Edward F. and Cara Lee Blume. "Mitsawokett to Bloomsbury: Archaeology and History of an Unrecognized Indigenous Community in Central Delaware", Delaware Department of Transportation Archaeology Series No. 154., Heite Consulting. Camden, Delaware 1998.
 Delaware's Invisible Indians, parts 1 and Heite, Edward F. and Louise Heite. Delaware's Invisible Indians, part 2, Database Online
 Kraft, Herbert C. The Lenape-Delaware Indian Heritage: 10,000 B.C. – A.D. 2000. Shamong, NJ: Lenape Books, 2001.
 [http://www.nanticoke-lenape.info/images/We_Are_Still_Here_Nanticoke_and_Lenape_History_Booklet_pre-release_v2.pdf Norwood, John R. We Are Still Here: The Tribal Saga of New Jersey's Nanticoke and Lenape Indians.] Moorestown, NJ: Native New Jersey, 2007
 Porter, Frank W. III. The Nanticoke. New York, New Haven, London: Chelsea House Publishers, 1987
 Scharf, Thomas. A History of Maryland From The Earliest Period to the Present Day, Vol.1. Baltimore, MD: John B. Piet, 1879
 Speck, Frank G. The Nanticoke Community of Delaware. New York: The Museum of the American Indian, Heye Foundation, 1915
 Speck, Frank G. The Nanticoke and Conoy Indians. Wilmington, Delaware: The Historical Society of Delaware, 1927
 Tayac, Gabrielle Ph.D. and Edwin Schupman. We Have A Story To Tell: The Native Peoples of the Chesapeake Region. Edited by Mark Hirsch. Washington, DC: The National Museum of the American Indian, Smithsonian Institution, 2006
 Weslager, C. A. Delaware’s Forgotten Folk: The Story of the Moors and Nanticokes, Philadelphia, PA: University of Pennsylvania Press, 1943
 Weslager, C. A. The Nanticoke Indians Past and Present, Newark, DE: The University of Delaware Press, 1983
 Zeisberger, David. David Zeisberger’s History of the Northern American Indians, edited by Archer Butler Hubert and William Nathaniel Schwarze. Lewisburg, PA: Wennawoods Publishing, 1999

External links 
 Nanticoke Lenni-Lenape Tribal Nation
 Nanticoke Lenni-Lenape Information Website

Lenape
Nanticoke tribe
Algonquian ethnonyms
Native American tribes in Maryland
Native American tribes in New Jersey